Linda Olofsson (born 29 August 1972 in Piteå, Norrbotten), later Linda Andersson, is a former female freestyle swimmer from Sweden. She competed twice at the Summer Olympics for her native country, in 1992 and 1996, both in the women's 50 m freestyle and the women's 4×100 m freestyle.

References

1972 births
Living people
Swimmers at the 1992 Summer Olympics
Swimmers at the 1996 Summer Olympics
Olympic swimmers of Sweden
People from Piteå
Swedish female freestyle swimmers
Medalists at the FINA World Swimming Championships (25 m)
European Aquatics Championships medalists in swimming
Sportspeople from Norrbotten County
20th-century Swedish women